Macrohyporia is a genus of fungi in the family Polyporaceae. The genus was circumscribed by mycologists I. Johansen and Leif Ryvarden in 1979.

References

Polyporaceae
Polyporales genera
Taxa named by Leif Ryvarden
Fungi described in 1979